Jesse Herbert Doyle (April 14, 1898 – April 15, 1961) was a Major League Baseball pitcher.

Sources

Major League Baseball pitchers
Detroit Tigers players
St. Louis Browns players
Greenville Spinners players
Vernon Tigers players
Toronto Maple Leafs (International League) players
Fort Worth Panthers players
Toledo Mud Hens players
Columbus Senators players
Baseball players from Tennessee
1898 births
1961 deaths